Robert Brown Thyne (9 January 1920 – 16 September 1986) was a Scottish footballer. He played for Darlington in the English Football League and Kilmarnock in the Scottish Football League. Thyne played for Kilmarnock in the 1952 Scottish League Cup Final and played twice for Scotland in unofficial wartime internationals.

References

External links 

1920 births
1986 deaths
Scottish footballers
Darlington F.C. players
Kilmarnock F.C. players
Footballers from Glasgow
Clydebank Juniors F.C. players
Scottish Football League players
English Football League players
Association football central defenders
Scotland wartime international footballers
Scottish Junior Football Association players